Bayerotrochus charlestonensis is a species of large sea snail, a marine gastropod mollusk in the family Pleurotomariidae, the slit snails.

Description
The length of the shell varies between 40 mm and 87 mm.

Distribution
This species occurs in the Atlantic Ocean off South Carolina, USA.

References

External links
 To Biodiversity Heritage Library (1 publication)
 To Encyclopedia of Life
 To USNM Invertebrate Zoology Mollusca Collection
 To World Register of Marine Species
 

Pleurotomariidae
Gastropods described in 1987